Spinoparapachymorpha is a genus of stick insects in the tribe Medaurini, erected by G.W.C. Ho in 2021.  Species have been recorded from: China, Laos, Myanmar, Thailand and Vietnam.

Species
The Phasmida Species File lists:
 Spinoparapachymorpha daoyingi (Ho, 2014)
 Spinoparapachymorpha jinpingensis (Ho, 2017)
 Spinoparapachymorpha pseudospinosa (Ho, 2020)
 Spinoparapachymorpha sinica (Ho, 2017) - type species
 Spinoparapachymorpha spinosa (Brunner von Wattenwyl, 1893)
 Spinoparapachymorpha tetracantha (Chen & He, 2001)
 Spinoparapachymorpha xishuangbannaensis (Ho, 2014)

References

External links

Phasmatodea genera
Phasmatodea of Asia
Phasmatidae